Volnaya may refer to:

Sviatlana Volnaya (born 1979), Belarusian women's basketball player
Volnaya River, river in Moscow Oblast, Russia